Eoline  is an unincorporated community in Bibb County, Alabama, United States. During the 2011 Super Outbreak, the Eoline Fire Department was totaled by an EF3 tornado.

History
The community was located on the Mobile and Ohio Railroad and was named after the daughter of the M&O Vice-President, Edward Russell. At one point, Eoline was home to three stores, a boarding stable, hotel, and newspaper. A post office operated under the name Eoline from 1898 to 1957.

References

Unincorporated communities in Bibb County, Alabama
Unincorporated communities in Alabama